Darclee is a 1961 Romanian drama film directed by Mihai Iacob. It was entered into the 1961 Cannes Film Festival.

Cast
  as Darclée
 Victor Rebengiuc as Iorgu
 Marcel Anghelescu
 Costache Antoniu
 Chris Avram
 
 Jules Cazaban
 Ion Dichiseanu
 
 Fory Etterle
 
 Ștefan Mihăilescu-Brăila
 Nelly Nicolau
 Amza Pellea

References

External links
 

1961 films
1961 drama films
Films directed by Mihai Iacob
Romanian drama films
1960s Romanian-language films